The 1920 Green Bay Packers season was their second season of competition.  Mostly playing other independent professional teams in Wisconsin, the team finished with a 9–1–1 record under player and coach Curly Lambeau.

Season results
Playing games from late September to late November the Packers lost only one game, tied another and won nine times.  The offense scored more than 20 points per game while the defense posted shutouts in eight out of the eleven games.  Overall, the team finished second among Wisconsin teams for the second consecutive year.

Home Field
In 1920 the Packers continued playing home games at Hagemeister park.  That year the city built stands on one side of the field.  This was the first time the Packers were able to charge an admission.  The Packers played ten home games in the 1920 season winning nine times and tying once.  In the first year of professional Thanksgiving Football, the Packers played and defeated the Stambaugh Miners, 14–0, in Green Bay. This would be the first of only two occasions when the Packers would play at home on Thanksgiving, out of 33 total Thanksgiving games.

Roster
Over the offseason, Green Bay added eight players to the roster and lost six. In total, twenty-seven players competed for the Packers in 1920.

References

External links
 Sportsencyclopedia.com

Green Bay Packers seasons
Green Bay
Green Bay Packers